Stórhöfði is a peninsula and the southernmost point of Heimaey, the largest island in the Vestmannaeyjar archipelago, in Iceland. It is claimed to be the windiest place in Europe, and holds the record for the lowest on land observation of air pressure in Europe. The name means great cape and was also the name of a street in Reykjavik's Höfði industrial area until 2015 when it was renamed Svarthöfði (black cape), which is the Icelandic term for Darth Vader. The street had formerly been named Bratthöfði, which translates as steep cape.

Stórhöfði is the location of one of the oldest lighthouses in Iceland, having operated since 1906. Weather observations began at the lighthouse in 1921, which, since 1940, have been conducted at night too.

References

Headlands of Iceland
Peninsulas of Iceland